Skull Mexican makeup, sugar skull makeup or calavera makeup, is a makeup style that is used to create the appearance of the character La Calavera Catrina that people use during Day of the Dead (Mexican Día de Muertos) festivities.

External links

Video
Video

References

Cosmetics
Mexican art
Personifications of death
Skulls in art